Lies and Butterflies is the seventh studio album by the Canadian rock band Mystery, released in July 2018 on Unicorn Digital.

The studio lineup for the band remained unchanged from their previous album Delusion Rain, with the exception of the departure of keyboardist Benoît Dupuis in 2016 who was succeeded by Antoine Michaud, guitarist in the live band in 2014 and a session musician on Delusion Rain.

Production

Album title
The title of the album went through several changes before it was finally decided to call it Lies and Butterflies. The album had at least two titles before the working title of Butterfly was suggested, which was also the working title for the song "Chrysalis". Chrysalis was the next working title, and when it was decided not to name the album Chrysalis, "Butterfly" was renamed to "Chrysalis". Ultimately, the final title was suggested by drummer Jean-Sébastien Goyette and finalized the same day.

Songs
The first track "Looking for Something Else" opens with the sound of applause and cheering from an audience, which is a recording taken from the end of the band's previous live release Second Home and is intended to act as a continuation.

The fifth track on the album, "Dare to Dream" is the second song in Mystery's catalog for which St-Père does not have a writing credit, the first being "Virtual Mentality" on Theatre of the Mind written by former keyboardist Benoît Dupuis. The music on "Dare to Dream" was written by Pageau, his first writing credit on a Mystery song, with the lyrics written by Hans Raffelt and Pageau. The song was written many years prior and was one of the tracks considered for Delusion Rain but ultimately it was decided to not release the song at that time.

Guitarist Sylvain Moineau wrote the music for the sixth song on the album "Where Dreams Come Alive" and St-Père wrote the lyrics. It is the first songwriting credit for Moineau on a Mystery album.

The closing track "Chrysalis" saw its beginnings approximately twenty-five years before the release of the album when St-Père wrote the beginning and main parts of the song.

Cover art
The cover art for the album was created by photographer Julie de Waroquier and is entitled Bad News.

Release

Lies and Butterflies was released on July 14, 2018, the same day the band played in the Night of the Prog Festival in Germany. The album was released on vinyl by Polish label Oskar Records, who previously released Mystery's The World is a Game and Delusion Rain on vinyl.

The album reached number 12 on the Official Charts Official Independent Album Breakers Chart Top 20 and number 25 on the Official Rock & Metal Albums Chart Top 40 for the week of August 24 through August 30, 2018.

Track listing

Personnel
 Jean Pageau - vocals, keyboards, flute
 Michel St-Père - electric and acoustic guitars, keyboards
 François Fournier - bass guitar, Taurus pedals, keyboards
 Sylvain Moineau - guitars, keyboards
 Jean-Sébastien Goyette - drums
 Antoine Michaud - keyboards

Release information
CD - Unicorn Digital - UNCR-5120 - 2018
Vinyl - Oskar - 008/009LP - 2018

References

2018 albums
Mystery (band) albums
Symphonic rock albums
Hard rock albums by Canadian artists